The 2015 Lamar Hunt U.S. Open Cup tournament proper will feature teams from all five tiers of men's soccer of the American Soccer Pyramid.

All teams from the first three levels qualify. For the fourth and fifth tiers of the pyramid, a series of qualification and state tournaments are held to determine the berths into the tournament. These teams will complete the 91-team field in the U.S. Open Cup.

National Premier Soccer League (12) 

On February 4, 2015, the NPSL announced 7 of the 12 NPSL sides for the US Open Cup listed below.  Each of these teams was a playoff team from the previous season:

 Brooklyn Italians
 Chattanooga FC
 GBFC Thunder
 Lansing United
 Miami United F.C.
 Tulsa Athletics
 Upward Stars

On March 20, 3 additional teams were announced leaving 2 spots to be claimed.

 Detroit City FC
 Fort Pitt FC Regiment
 Virginia Beach City FC

On March 21, Sonoma County Sol qualified out of the Golden Gate Conference, leaving 1 team to qualify.

On March 22 FC Tacoma 253 became the final team to qualify.

West Region - Southwest Conference Qualifying Tournament
All four teams of the 2015 Southwest Conference competed in the qualifying tournament with FC Hasental and the San Diego Flash receiving first round byes.

Matches 

Winner advances to West Region - Conference Playoff

West Region - Northwest Conference Qualifying Tournament

Winner advances to West Region - Conference Playoff

West Region - Conference Playoff

FC Tacoma 253 advances to Open Cup

West Region - Golden Gate Conference Qualifying Tournament
All five teams of the 2015 Golden Gate Conference will compete in the qualifying tournament with Sacramento Gold and Real San Jose starting off with a play-in game.

Matches 

Sonoma County Sol advances to Open Cup

USASA (11) 
The USASA was allocated 11 qualifying spots in this years tournament.

The USASA adopted new qualification standards for the 2014 tournament citing earlier qualifying deadlines by USSF. They will now use the results from the previous calendar years tournaments to determine regional qualifiers. Region I has already adopted that their qualifiers will be the regional champion of both the USASA National Cup and the USASA US Amateur Cup. Other regions have yet to announce who they will qualify.

US Club Soccer (1) 

San Francisco City FC

USSSA (1) 

Tournament took place between March 13 and March 15 at the Overland Park Soccer Complex in Overland Park, Kansas. 6 teams participated for one spot in the US Open Cup.  The following teams competed. Colorado Rovers S.C.(Golden, CO), KC Athletics (Prairie View, KS), Monaco F.C. (Denver, CO), Colorado Sporting Premier (Auorora, CO), ASC Newstars (Houston, TX), Harpo's F.C.(Boulder, CO) 

The KC Athletics and Harpo's FC advanced to the final with KC winning 3–1. However, Harpo's FC advanced as well as KC to the US Open Cup due to KC Athletics having already qualified through USASA Region 2. They would again meet in the Preliminary Round of the Open Cup, with Harpo's FC advancing with a 2–1 victory.

References

External links
 U.S. Soccer Federation
 TheCup.us - Unofficial U.S. Open Cup News 

U.S. Open Cup